The 1872 Democratic National Convention was a presidential nominating convention held at Ford's Grand Opera House on East Fayette Street, between North Howard and North Eutaw Streets, in Baltimore, Maryland on July 9 and 10, 1872. It resulted in the nomination of newspaper publisher Horace Greeley of New York and Governor Benjamin Gratz Brown of Missouri for president and vice president, a ticket previously nominated by the rump Liberal Republican faction convention meeting, also held in Baltimore's newly built premier Opera House of nationally well-known theatre owner/operator John T. Ford (infamous as the owner of the Ford's Theatre in Washington, D.C. where 16th President Abraham Lincoln was assassinated in April 1865) of the major Republican Party, which had already re-nominated incumbent President Ulysses S. Grant of the regular Republicans for another term.

The convention was called to order by Democratic National Committee chairman August Belmont. Thomas Jefferson Randolph served as the convention's temporary chairman and James R. Doolittle served as permanent president. At six hours in length, stretched over two days, the convention was the shortest meeting of a major political party convention in history.

The convention 

Accepting the "Liberal Republican" platform meant the Democrats had accepted the "New Departure", rejecting the anti-Reconstruction platform of 1868: they realized that in order to win, they had to look forward and not try to refight the Civil War.

While Greeley's long reputation in the years before as the most aggressive attacker of the earlier Democratic Party, its principles, its leadership, and its activists cooled enthusiasm among many of the delegates for the potential nominee, it was accepted that the Democrats would only split the anti-Grant vote and all but assure Grant of re-election if they nominated any other candidate.

Presidential nomination

Presidential candidates 

Major General William B. Franklin was approached by a group of Democrats from Pennsylvania and New Jersey who urged him to run against Horace Greeley for the party's presidential nomination. Citing a need for party unity, Franklin declined their suggestion. On the first ballot, Pennsylvania and New Jersey would cast the majority of votes against Greeley.

Horace Greeley received 686 of the 732 delegate votes cast on the first ballot. The motion to have Greeley's nomination be declared unanimous was carried.

Source: Official proceedings of the National Democratic convention, held at Baltimore, July 9, 1872. (September 3, 2012).

Vice Presidential nomination

Vice Presidential candidates 

Benjamin G. Brown received 713 of the 732 delegate votes cast on the first ballot.

Source: Official proceedings of the National Democratic convention, held at Baltimore, July 9, 1872. (September 3, 2012).

Straight-Out Democrats Convention 
A splinter, conservative group of Democrats broke off due to their dissatisfaction with the nomination of Greeley.

Calling themselves the Straight-Out Democrats, they held a Straight-Out Democratic National Convention in Louisville, Kentucky. They nominated for President Charles O'Conor, who told them by telegram that he would not accept their nomination, and John Quincy Adams II for vice president. The candidates received 23,054 votes (0.35%) in the election, and no Electoral College electors.

See also 
 History of the United States Democratic Party
 History of Baltimore
 U.S. presidential nomination convention
 1872 United States presidential election
 List of Democratic National Conventions
 1872 Liberal Republican convention
 1872 Republican National Convention
 Ulysses S. Grant

References

Primary sources 
 Chester, Edward W A guide to political platforms (1977) pp 90–96 online

External links 

 Official proceedings of the National Democratic convention, held at Baltimore, July 9, 1872
 Democratic Party Platform of 1872 at The American Presidency Project

Democratic National Conventions
19th century in Baltimore
1872 United States presidential election
Political conventions in Baltimore
1872 in Maryland
Maryland Democratic Party
Political events in Maryland
1872 conferences
July 1872 events